Nicolas "Nico" LaHood (born September 16, 1972) is a former Criminal District Attorney of Bexar County, Texas.

Early life and education
Nicholas Anthony LaHood was born on September 16, 1972 to Judge Michael Thomas LaHood Sr. and Norma Olivia (née Mendiola) in San Antonio, Texas.

While in his third year at San Antonio College in 1994, LaHood was arrested for attempting to sell  ecstasy pills worth $3,600, with a firearm to an undercover police officer at a strip club. He entered into a plea bargain in August 1994 and was given deferred adjudication and probation.

LaHood graduated from St. Mary's University in 1999 and then law school in 2002.

Career
LaHood ran for District Attorney in 2010 but narrowly lost to Susan Reed. Controversies that contributed to his loss included his age, past drug arrest, and firearm charges. After the election, LaHood had already decided to run again in 2014. In the 2014 Democratic primaries for the District Attorney race, LaHood faced off against Therese Huntzinger. LaHood narrowly beat his opponent: LaHood received 20,413 votes, just 47 more than Huntzinger's 20,366. In the 2014 election for District Attorney, LaHood defeated Susan Reed, the incumbent. LaHood was sworn in as the new DA on January 1, 2015.

In 2017, state district judge Lori Valenzuela testified that LaHood had threatened the careers of two defense attorneys if they brought up an affair between a prosecutor in his office and a key witness for the prosecution in a murder case. Judge Valenzuela, who presided over the case, testified under oath that she had witnessed the threats made in her chambers. LaHood also testified, denying that he had made a threat.

LaHood has promoted the unfounded conspiracy theory that vaccines are linked to autism. In a statement videotaped in his office for the anti-vaccine film Vaxxed, Lahood asserted that vaccines "can and do cause autism," LaHood repeated these claims in testimony to a Texas House committee. LaHood also stated that Islam is a "horrifically violent" religion.

On March 6, 2018, LaHood lost the Democratic primary for District Attorney to Joe Gonzales by more than 18 percentage points.

In September 2018, LaHood announced he was leaving the Democratic party, saying "leftists have taken over".

Personal life
LaHood married Davida Gil on July 8, 2006. They have four children together. 
On August 15, 1996, LaHood's brother Michael LaHood Jr. was murdered in the driveway of his parents' house after a failed robbery. The triggerman Mauriceo Mashawn Brown, along with three other men, were later caught and tried. Under the Texas law of parties, not only Mauriceo Mashawn Brown, but also the driver of the car that carried Brown, Kenneth Foster Jr., was tried for capital murder, and in May 1997 both were sentenced to death. In July 2006, Mauriceo Brown was executed for the crime by lethal injection. On August 31, 2007, Foster's death sentence was commuted by Governor Rick Perry.

References

County district attorneys in Texas
American judges
Living people
1972 births
St. Mary's University, Texas alumni